Magharet el Kantara or Shaw's Cave (arched cave) is a rock art shelter of the Gilf Kebir National Park in the New Valley Governorate, Egypt. Located on the south-western slopes of Gilf Kebir, it was discovered in 1935 by the explorers Bill Kennedy Shaw and Rupert Harding Newman.

Description
About half a meter above the ground there are rock paintings of a herd of differently drawn cattle and a farmstead representing a rare example of cattle paintings in the Gilf Kebir that otherwise are abundant in the nearby Jebel Ouenat. These Neolithic rock paintings testify the favorable climatic conditions of life during the African humid period much different from the present one.

References

Saharan rock art
New Valley Governorate
Caves of Egypt
Archaeological sites in Egypt